Abraham F. Arvizu, or Abe Arvizu Sr. (1928–1988), was a pioneering community activist and youth developer from Phoenix, Arizona, and is credited with being the "driving force" of the Southside Catholic Youth Center, the forerunner of the Barrio Youth Project. Barrio Youth Project and Chicanos Por La Causa organized the boycott against the Phoenix Union High School District from October 9 – November 2, 1970, which led to systematic wide changes to end the discrimination of Mexican-Americans within the local school system. Arvizu, a member of the parish council of the Historic Sacred Heart Church, advocated and voted in support of allowing young Chicano activists to use Santa Rita Hall for community engagement efforts, which led to the founding of Chicanos Por La Causa in 1969. For his efforts, Arvizu was subsequently elected to the Board of Directors of Chicanos Por La Causa, representing barrios east of Central Avenue, and many of the youth he developed went on to be political activists, elected officials, and contributing members to society.
He was married to Mariana Ochoa until his death. The couple had four children: Abraham J. Arvizu, Jr., Michael Arvizu, Cynthia "Cindi" Arvizu, and Linda Arvizu.

References

Businesspeople from Phoenix, Arizona
20th-century American businesspeople
American civil rights activists
Activists from Arizona
Activists for African-American civil rights
American civil rights activists (civil rights movement)